Damir Filipović (born 1970 in Switzerland) is a Swiss mathematician specializing in quantitative finance. He holds the Swissquote Chair in Quantitative Finance and is the director of the Swiss Finance Institute at EPFL (École Polytechnique Fédérale de Lausanne).

Career 
Filipović studied mathematics at ETH Zurich and earned his Master's degree in 1995. He joined Freddy Delbaen as PhD student and graduated in 2000 with thesis on mathematical finance titled "Consistency problems for HJM interest rate models".

As a postdoctoral research fellow he joined Vienna University of Technology (2000), Stanford University (2001) and Princeton University (2001) to work on consistency problems for Heath-Jarrow-Morton interest rate models and affine processes and applications in finance.

From 2002 to 2003 he was an assistant professor at Princeton University's Department of Operations Research and Financial Engineering. As scientific consultant for solvency testing and risk analysis in insurance (Swiss Solvency Test) he joined the Swiss Federal Office of Private Insurance (BPV) in 2003. In 2004, he became full professor on the Chair of Financial and Insurance Mathematics at the Ludwig Maximilian University of Munich. In 2007, he was appointed as director of the Vienna Institute of Finance and full professor at the University of Vienna.

Since 2010 he has been the Swissquote Chair in Quantitative Finance and director of the Swiss Finance Institute at EPFL.

Research 
Filipović's research focuses on quantitative finance by drawing in an interdisciplinary manner on fields such as quantitative finance, quantitative risk management, and machine learning in finance. It aims at both the advancement of theoretical understanding of financial engineering, and its implementation in the financial industry and governmental policies. His research interests encompass polynomial processes and applications in finance, systemic risk in financial networks, Interest rates, credit risk, stochastic volatility, Stochastic processes, quantitative risk management and regulation, and machine learning in finance.

He also teaches a MOOC on "Interest Rate Models" on Coursera.

Distinctions 
Filipović is the 2016 recipient of the Louis Bachelier Prize awarded by the London Mathematical Society, the Natixis Foundation for Quantitative Research and the Société de Mathématiques Appliquées et Industrielles.

He is a member and former president (2016–2017) of the Bachelier finance society.

He has been an associate editor at academic journals such as Mathematics and Financial Economics, Stochastics, SIAM Journal on Financial Mathematics, Mathematical Finance, and Finance and Stochastics.

Selected works

References

External links 
 
 Website of the Swissquote Chair in Quantitative Finance
 MOOC on Interest Rate Models

1970 births
Living people
ETH Zurich alumni
TU Wien alumni
Academic staff of the École Polytechnique Fédérale de Lausanne
Swiss mathematicians
Swiss economists